Borderland is an upcoming British film made for Sky Cinema starring Aml Ameen, Colin Morgan, Felicity Jones and Mark Strong. Written by Ronan Bennett and The Guard Brothers who also direct, it is produced by Ingenious Media and Rocket Science in association with Screen Scotland and LipSync Productions.

Synopsis
A retired Irish paramilitary (Morgan) witnesses the shooting of his pregnant wife by an SAS officer (Ameen) and escapes wounded, and presumed dead, to 1970’s London to plot his revenge.

Cast
 Aml Ameen as Tempest
 Colin Morgan as Micheal 
 Felicity Jones
 Mark Strong
 Sophia Brown as Ruth 
 Tom Vaughan-Lawlor
 Máiréad Tyers as Carol 
 Steve Wall as Quinn
 Rory Grant

Production
Written by Ronan Bennett, he had written the first version of the script in 2012, Bennett had been inspired by the book The Road To Balcombe Street by Steven S. Moysey. 

Borderland was originally announced in 2020 with John Boyega and Jack Reynor in the lead roles.
The Guard Brothers direct the project and have a co-writing credit. The film was one of many that had its production delayed by the Covid-19 pandemic. It is produced by Sky Cinema, Ingenious Media and Rocket Science in association with Screen Scotland and LipSync. Producers are Chris Coen, Brian Coffey, Rebecca Brown and Thorsten Schumacher. 

Filming began in April 2022 in Edinburgh and Glasgow. Props and other items from the set were donated to local charities in Scotland after location filming ended.

References

External links

Upcoming films
2023 films
Films shot in Glasgow
Films shot in Edinburgh
Films about the Irish Republican Army
Films about The Troubles (Northern Ireland) 
Films impacted by the COVID-19 pandemic